Russell Township may refer to:

Canada 

Russell, Ontario

United States 

 Russell Township, Lafayette County, Arkansas, in Lafayette County, Arkansas
 Russell Township, White County, Arkansas, in White County, Arkansas
 Russell Township, Lawrence County, Illinois
 Russell Township, Putnam County, Indiana
 Russell Township, Russell County, Kansas
 Russell Township, Camden County, Missouri
 Russell Township, Macon County, Missouri, in Macon County, Missouri
 Russell Township, LaMoure County, North Dakota, in LaMoure County, North Dakota
 Russell Township, Geauga County, Ohio

Township name disambiguation pages